William Nelson Page  (January 6, 1854 – March 7, 1932) was an American civil engineer and industrialist. He was active in the Virginias following the U.S. Civil War. Page was widely known as a metallurgical expert by other industry leaders and investors as well as state and federal authorities.

William Page became one of the leading managers and developers of West Virginia's rich bituminous coalfields in the late-19th and early-20th century, as well as being deeply involved in building the railroads and other infrastructure necessary to process and transport the mined coal.  Page often worked as a manager for absentee owners, such as the British geological expert, Dr. David T. Ansted, and the New York City mayor, Abram S. Hewitt of the Cooper-Hewitt organization and other New York and Boston financiers, or as the "front man" in projects involving a silent partner, such as Henry H. Rogers. In the town of Ansted, for 28 years, the Page family lived in a large Victorian mansion built by carpenters of the Gauley Mountain Coal Company.

Most notable among Page's many accomplishments was a project to acquire land and construct a modest short-line railroad to tap new coal reserves in a rugged portion of southern West Virginia not yet reached by the bigger railroads. Connections planned to both the Chesapeake and Ohio Railway (C&O) and the Norfolk and Western Railway (N&W) should have inspired competition among rival carriers to transport the coal the rest of the way to market. However, collusion by the leaders of the large railroads attempted to stop the project through agreeing to only offer Page unprofitable rates. Instead of giving up, working with Rogers discreetly providing the millions needed for financing, William Page and his associates expanded the "short line" all the way hundred of miles across the Virginias to a new coal pier built on Hampton Roads, creating the Virginian Railway. Completed in 1909, the VGN was built to be very efficient and during the first half of the 20th century, became widely known as the "Richest Little Railroad in the World."

William and Emma completed their lives in Washington D.C., where they moved in 1917 as he served as a mining expert before federal regulators. One of their younger sons, Randolph Gilham "Dizzy" Page, was an early pioneer of the U.S. air mail industry during this time until his death of a heart attack at 36. William and Emma died in 1932 and 1933 respectively, and were interred in Richmond, Virginia's Hollywood Cemetery.

Early life, heritage of public service

William Nelson Page was born at "Locust Grove" in Campbell County, Virginia on January 6, 1854 into an old Virginia family.  His parents were Edwin Randolph Page (1822–1864) and Olivia (née Alexander) Page (1820–1896), a scion of the Nelson family. He descended from historic roots; the Nelson and Page families were each among the "First Families of Virginia", families who were prominent in the Virginia Colony.

Through the Nelson family, he was a descendant of Robert "King" Carter (1663–1732), who served as an acting royal  governor of Virginia and was one of its wealthiest landowners in the late 17th and early 18th centuries. After the American Revolutionary War, two of his great-grandfathers served as Governor of the Commonwealth of Virginia. Some years later, in 1905, another relative, Logan Waller Page, became the first head of the U.S. Bureau of Public Roads, an early precursor of the agency which became the U.S. Department of Transportation. Logan Page served as an energetic advocate of the country's early interstate highway system until his death in 1918.

Although his father died in 1861, and notwithstanding the financial hardships which were widespread in the South brought on by the Civil War which began that year, from a family base in Rockbridge and Augusta counties, where his mother and siblings relocated, young William Nelson Page was educated at the University of Virginia as a civil engineer.

After the cessation of hostilities in 1865, as he launched his career, he participated in some local politics and civic activities, but primarily directed his considerable energies into developing transportation and mineral resources in the mountainous regions of Virginia and the newly formed state of West Virginia. Between 1871 and 1876, William Page played a role in engineering and building the Chesapeake and Ohio Railway (C&O), which was under the leadership of Collis P. Huntington. Initially, he led one of the surveying parties charged with mapping the route of a double-track railway that had been ordered by Congress. This new railway was expected to run between Richmond, Virginia and the Ohio River (at what became Huntington, West Virginia), via the valleys of the James River and Jackson River in Virginia, and the New River and Kanawha River in West Virginia. He chose the location and directed the construction of several important C&O bridges. While working with the C&O, Page became fascinated with the potential of the untapped mineral resources of West Virginia.

Family and children
William's father, a farmer, died in 1862, but his education continued. Olivia Page, William's widowed mother, owned several farms in Rockbridge County, Virginia, where she  relocated. Both William and Emma had roots in the central Shenandoah Valley area named for nearby Natural Bridge.

His future wife, Emma Hayden Gilham (1855–1933), had been born at Lexington in Rockbridge County, Virginia. She was the youngest daughter of Major William Gilham, a former Commandant of the Virginia Military Institute (VMI). Emma's parents moved to Richmond at the outset of the American Civil War, where her father helped with Virginia and Confederate troop training. after the end of hostilities in 1865, he worked for a fertilizer company. He died in 1872.

On February 8, 1882, Page married Emma Hayden Gilham (1855–1933) in Richmond, Virginia. By this time, William had become well-established in the region and had been named as General Manager and a Director of the Gauley Mountain Coal Company at the urging of an old friend and trustee, attorney Thomas D. Ransom of Staunton, Virginia.

Emma and William settled in the town of Ansted in Fayette County, West Virginia, where they raised their family, which included four children who lived beyond infancy. Their palatial white Victorian mansion was built by Gauley Mountain Coal Company carpenters, on a knoll in the middle of town. Later known as the Page-Vawter House, it remained has been preserved and restored and remained as a community landmark as of 2010.

Entrepreneur and developer

A knowledgeable man with the training and experience as a civil engineer and the spirit of an entrepreneur, Page was well-prepared to help develop West Virginia's hidden wealth: huge deposits of "smokeless" bituminous coal, a product exceptionally well-suited for making steel. Former West Virginia Governor William A. MacCorkle described him as a man who knew the land "as a farmer knows a field."

Page became a protégé of Dr. David T. Ansted, a noted British geologist with large land holdings in southern West Virginia. As his career developed, Page busied himself with many enterprises to develop the natural resources which lay all around him, primarily working with iron and coal operations, often as the manager for absentee owners.

He was the general manager of the Hawks Nest Coal Co. between 1877 and 1880, superintendent of the Victoria Blast Furnace at Goshen, Virginia from 1880 to 1885, and he located and built the Powellton bridge for the C&O between 1885 and 1889. After developing the Mt. Carbon Collieries, he organized and developed the Gauley Mountain Coal Company, and he became a consulting engineer for other coal-producing firms as well. He was also involved with the Virginia and Pittsburgh Land Association (a land development company) and the Pittsburgh and Virginia Railroad Company.

Of course, with his background with the C&O, Page was intensely interested in railroads, and he gained even more practical railroad experience after winning the contract to convert the C&O branch-line track, from the New River main line, up the mountainside to Ansted, to standard gauge. The project was completed on 20 August 1890, at a cost of $35,038.44.

He was later a principal of the Page Coal and Coke Company.

The "idea man from Ansted"
William and Emma Page settled their family in the tiny mountain hamlet of Ansted, a town with a population of 2,000 (named for Dr. Ansted) located in Fayette County, West Virginia. Ansted sits on high bluffs on Gauley Mountain near an outcropping of rocks called Hawk's Nest overlooking the New River far below, where the Chesapeake and Ohio Railway tracks occupied both sides of the narrow valley. In the late 1870s, Emma and William's widowed mother, Olivia Page, who had come to live with them, were influential in establishing the Church of the Redeemer, the Episcopal Church in Ansted.

In 1889, while he was president of the Gauley Mountain Coal Company, Page had a palatial white Victorian mansion built by company carpenters on a knoll in the middle of town. Architect William Minter designed the house in a Gothic style. It has 15 regular rooms, plus a butler's pantry and a dressing room. There are 11 fireplaces with hand-carved wooden mantels; most are in different styles. Even the doors have ornately decorated hinges. The exterior features 52 8-foot-tall windows. The mansion, now known as the Page-Vawter House, became a symbol of wealth and power. It remains a community landmark over 100 years later.

"Colonel" Page, as he became known, was in truth, a uniformed captain and later a major in a locally recruited Spanish–American War militia. ("Colonel" was an honorific title used informally in the South for many notable men in the years following the American Civil War). A colorful character by all accounts, he was described as a slight man who was known for his handlebar mustache, pince-nez glasses, iron bowler derby, and elegant suits. He was considered to be somewhat aloof by the local population, and could frequently be seen riding a bicycle on the sloping lawn of the mansion, where eight servants were employed.

Described years later by author H. Reid as "the idea man from Ansted," Page spent long hours working in the den just off the main entrance to his resplendent home. In addition to pursuing business interests, Page also found time to serve as the mayor of Ansted for 10 years and rose to the rank of brigadier inspector general in the West Virginia National Guard. In 1907, he was named as the first president of Ansted National Bank. He was also an incorporator and director of Sheltering Arms Hospital in neighboring Kanawha County.

However, of all of his many activities, William Nelson Page is probably best known for the founding and building of the Virginian Railway (VGN). It started much like just another of his many projects, but would ultimately grow far beyond its original scope. The story of the building of the Virginian Railway has been described as a textbook example of natural resources, railroads, and a smaller company taking on big business (and winning) early in the 20th century.

Building the Virginian Railway

Some historians will hold that the Loup Creek enterprise originally was planned to be just another local mining operation, one that would ship primary product, coal, out of the region via the common carrier railroads. Officially, it was only after problems arose that the plan was expanded to build and operate rail connections, or even build all the way to the sea. This is the version Page used in an I.C.C. hearing.

However, other historians believe that a goal of the plan from the outset was to transport from the mineheads to reach a shipping point without using these common carriers, who as owners of vast coal lands and many mines, were also competitors. There was a lot at stake, as the C&O and the N&W through the secret "community of interests" pact were carefully controlling coal shipping rates. A non-affiliated competitor would threaten that cozy relationship.

The Virginian Railway

Most notable among Page's many projects was a partnership with absentee investors, begun in 1898, to acquire land and construct a modest short-line railroad to tap new coal reserves in a rugged portion of southern West Virginia not yet reached by the bigger railroads. The project was intended to establish connections to both the Chesapeake and Ohio Railway (C&O) and the Norfolk and Western Railway (N&W), which should have inspired competition among rival carriers to transport the coal the rest of the way to market. However, collusion by the leaders of the large railroads (lawful in an era before U.S. anti-trust laws were enacted) resulted in rates to transport the coal the additional distances to markets which, potentially, would have stopped the project.

However, if the C&O and N&W presidents thought they could discourage Page from developing the new areas, they were mistaken. One of the silent investors Page had enlisted was millionaire industrialist Henry Huttleston Rogers, a principal in John D. Rockefeller's Standard Oil Trust. A master at competitive "warfare", Henry Rogers did not like to lose, and, as one of the wealthiest men in America, he also had nearly unlimited resources.

By the time they realized what was happening, the C&O and N&W executives were faced with a new major competitor, a third railroad with direct access to an ocean port.

Victoria is created

Late in 1906, near the halfway point on the Tidewater Railway between Roanoke and Sewell's Point, a new town with space set aside for railroad offices and shops was created in Lunenburg County, Virginia. It was named Victoria, in honor of Queen Victoria of the United Kingdom, who was long-admired by Henry Rogers.

Victoria was the location of a large equipment maintenance operation, with roundhouse, turntable, coaling and water facilities for servicing steam locomotives, a large rail yard with many tracks, and a large single-story passenger station. Offices for the VGN's Norfolk Division were built by adding a second floor to the passenger station building a few years later.

Virginian Railway born, Jamestown Exposition
Early in 1907, with substantial portions of each still under construction, the Deepwater and Tidewater Railways were combined to become the Virginian Railway. On April 15, 1907, William Nelson Page was elected as its first president.

About the same time, a large stretch of the eastern portion of the Tidewater had been completed and regular passenger service was established between Norfolk and Victoria. This proved just in time for the new railroad to serve the Jamestown Exposition, which was held on land adjacent to the VGN coal pier site at Sewell's Point. At the exposition, Page served as Chief of International Jury of Awards, Mines and Metallurgy.

On April 26, 1907, US President Theodore Roosevelt opened the exposition. Mark Twain was another honored guest, arriving with his friend Henry Rogers on the latter's steam yacht, the Kanawha. In addition to President Roosevelt, the newly renamed Virginian Railway (VGN) transported many of the 3 million persons who attended before the Exposition closed on December 1, 1907.

Financial panic of 1907 – Rogers has stroke
Work progressed on the VGN during 1907 and 1908 using construction techniques not available when the larger railroads had been built about 25 years earlier, achieving a more favorable route and grade. By paying for work with Henry Rogers' own personal fortune, the railway was built with no public debt. This feat, a key feature of the successful secrecy in securing the route, was in all likelihood not part of Rogers' initial planning, and was not accomplished without some considerable burden to the financier, however. He had suffered some setbacks in the Financial Panic of 1907 which began in March of that year. Then, a few months later, he experienced a debilitating apoplectic stroke. Fortunately, Henry Rogers recovered his health, at least partially, and saw to it that construction was continued on the new railroad until it was finally completed early in 1909.

Final spike, celebrations

The final spike in the VGN was driven on 29 January 1909, at the west end of the massive New River Bridge at Glen Lyn, near where the new railroad crossed the West Virginia-Virginia state line. The former Deepwater and Tidewater Railways were now physically connected.

In April, 1909, Henry Huttleston Rogers and Mark Twain, old friends, returned to Norfolk together once again for a huge celebration of the new "Mountains to the Sea" railroad's completion.  Despite rain that day, a huge crowd of Norfolk citizens was waiting with great excitement at the shore to meet them. While Rogers toured the railway's new $2.5-million coal pier at Sewell's Point, Mark Twain spoke to groups of students at several local schools. That night, at a grand banquet held in downtown Norfolk, the city's civic leaders, Mark Twain, Rogers, and other dignitaries spoke. In either event, with the building of the VGN, what was accomplished was that a third shipper was established.

Rogers left the next day on his first (and only) tour of the newly completed railroad. He died suddenly, only six weeks later, at the age of 69, at his home in New York, because of another stroke. By then, the work of the Page-Rogers partnership in Building the Virginian Railway was complete.

Accomplishments
While neither William Page nor Henry Rogers ended up running their newly completed Virginian Railway, it was arguably a crowning lifetime achievement for each man. Together, they had conceived and built a modern, well-engineered rail pathway from the coal mines of West Virginia to port at Hampton Roads right under the noses of the big railroads. The Virginian Railway could operate more efficiently than its larger competitors, had all new infrastructure, and no debt. It was an accomplishment like no other in the history of US railroading, before or since.

The new railroad opened up isolated communities in both West Virginia and Virginia and soon helped develop new coalfields and other industries.

Throughout its profitable 50-year history, the VGN continued to follow the Page-Rogers policy of "paying up front for the best." It became particularly well known for treating its employees and vendors well, another investment which paid rich dividends. The VGN operated some of the largest and most innovative steam, electric, and diesel locomotives, and could afford to, earning the nickname "Richest Little Railroad in the World."

In time, the big railroads learned to coexist with their newer competitor, and came to regret turning down opportunities to purchase it before completion. There were many failed attempts by each of them and others to acquire the VGN.

Eventually, the owners of the VGN agreed to merge with arch-rival Norfolk and Western Railway in 1959. In 2004, much of the former Virginian Railway is still in use by N&W successor Norfolk Southern Railway (NS). The well-engineered low-gradient VGN route helps NS compete efficiently with rival CSX Transportation (successor to the VGN's old rival C&O) and non-rail transport modes in the transportation markets of the 21st century.

The latter years
After the Virginian Railway had been completed, Page busied himself with the coal-mining business in West Virginia, until he retired in 1917. He and his family then moved to Washington, D.C. William Nelson Page died at his home in Washington, in 1932, at the age of 78. He was interred in Hollywood Cemetery in Richmond, Virginia, where his wife, Emma, who died the following 14 February, is also buried.

Ancestry

Nelson family lineage
The Nelson lineage in Virginia began with Thomas "Scotch Tom" Nelson (1677–1745), a Scottish immigrant who settled at Yorktown in 1690. He was from Penrith (in present-day Cumbria). His son, William Nelson (1711–1772) was a royal governor of Virginia. William Nelson's son, Thomas Nelson, Jr. (1739–1789) (grandson of "Scotch Tom") was a signer of the Declaration of Independence, a Brigadier General during the American Revolutionary War and a governor after statehood.

Nelson County, Kentucky (formerly in Virginia before Kentucky became a state), Nelson County, Virginia and Thomas Nelson Community College in the Virginia Peninsula subregion of Hampton Roads are each named in honor of Thomas Nelson, Jr.  His son, Hugh Nelson (1768–1836) would later serve in the U.S. Congress. The circa 1730 Nelson House built by "Scotch Tom" Nelson in Yorktown, Virginia is a National Historical Landmark maintained by the Colonial National Historical Park of the U.S. National Park Service.

Page family lineage

The Page family lineage in Virginia began even earlier, in 1650, with the arrival from England of Colonel John Page (1628–1692) at Jamestown. He was from Middlesex (in the present London borough of Hounslow). Colonel Page was a prominent leader and developer of Middle Plantation, which became the site of the new College of William and Mary (chartered in 1693). Middle Plantation was soon thereafter designated as the new state capital and renamed Williamsburg.

The Page family included Mann Page (1749–1781), who became a U.S. Congressman in the new nation, as well as Governor John Page (1744–1808), who had grown up at Rosewell Plantation in Gloucester County. He was a classmate at the College of William and Mary with a young Thomas Jefferson, who stayed at his home while working on the early documents relating to independence for Virginia and the other colonies.

Later notable members of the Page family included U.S. Navy officer (and later Confederate Naval Commander and Army Brigadier General Richard Lucian Page (1807–1901) of Clarke County, Virginia, and William's cousin, writer and U.S. Ambassador Thomas Nelson Page (1853–1922).

In Williamsburg, Virginia, Page Street is named for Colonel John Page. Page County, Virginia was named in honor of Governor John Page.

Young cousins: Thomas Nelson Page and William Nelson Page

Among young William Nelson Page's contemporaries born in the mid-19th century was his first cousin, Thomas Nelson Page (1853–1922), of Beaverdam in  Hanover County. Although once among Virginia's wealthy elite, their respective family fortunes had diminished greatly by the time cousins William and Thomas Page were teenagers after the American Civil War devastated Virginia's economy.

However, during the War, when William was only 10 years old, his father, Edwin Randolph Page, died at their home "Locust Grove" in Campbell County, where he is interred in a family cemetery. William had two sisters, one slightly older, one younger, when his father died.

The Page cousins, Thomas and William, were each educated by the University of Virginia. Thomas, educated as a lawyer, was to gain fame writing of the "lost era" and an idealized antebellum Virginia (a style which became known as the plantation tradition genre). In addition to practicing law, he also served as a politician. In the administration of President Woodrow Wilson, he was the U.S. ambassador to Italy during World War I.

Meanwhile, William, a year younger, was tutored at home as a youngster, and then was sent to Northern Virginia where he attended Leesburg Academy in the Town of Leesburg, county seat of Loudoun county, and not far from the home of his paternal grandparents in Clarke County. He then attended special courses in engineering of the  University of Virginia in Charlottesville, and became a civil engineer.

Page's wife, Emma, and her family
William Page's wife, Emma, was one of seven children of Major William Gilham and his wife, Cordelia A Gilham. In 1860, her father prepared a well-known training manual for recruits and militia at the request of Virginia Governor Henry A. Wise, and was involved with early training of cadets at Camp Lee in Richmond, Virginia as the American Civil War broke out the following year.

After the War ended in 1865, William Gilham became president of fertilizer company in Richmond. Emma spent her teen-aged years in the former Confederate capital, where she was a débutante at one of Richmond's earliest "Germans", which were formal social gatherings for the young people (the name of these events had no relationship to Germany).  She was the sister of Julius Hayden Gilham (1852–1936) who is also buried in Hollywood Cemetery in Richmond, Virginia.

William Page and Emma Gilham both had roots and family in the Augusta County and Rockbridge County area of the upper Shenandoah Valley. (William's married sister lived in Staunton, Virginia.)  They had four children who survived childhood:  Delia Hayden Page (born 1882), Edwin Randolph Page (1884–1949), Mary Josephine Page (1893–1962), and Randolph Gilham Page (1893–1930).  They also had two other children who died in infancy: Evan Powell Page (born 1887) and William Gilham Page (born 1890).

Legacy

The unincorporated West Virginia coal and railroad towns of Page in Fayette County and Pageton in McDowell County were named for him.  The Page Coal and Coke Company operated in each, although coal mining has long since ended. The old company store in Pageton is listed on the National Register of Historic Places.

In the 21st century, William and Emma's mansion, now known as the Page-Vawter House, still stands in Ansted, on a high knoll, overlooking the town and the New River Valley. It is evidence of the once-thriving coal business. Later occupied by the Vawter family, the Page-Vawter House is also listed on the National Register of Historic Places. Nearby, breathtaking Hawk's Nest overlooks the New River Gorge National River.

The seemingly remotely located terminal Page and Rogers planned and built at Sewell's Point played an important role in 20th-century U.S. naval history. Beginning in 1917, the former Jamestown Exposition grounds adjacent to the VGN coal pier became an important facility for the United States Navy. The VGN transported the high quality "smokeless" West Virginia bituminous coal favored by the US Navy for its ships and submarines, providing a reliable supply during both World Wars. Today, the former VGN property at Sewell's Point is part of the Norfolk Navy Base, the largest naval facility in the world.

After Page retired in 1917, a ship was named in his honor. William N. Page was a steamship built at Camden, New Jersey, by the New York Ship Building and Dry Dock Corp. It was taken over by the US Navy for operation by the Naval Overseas Transportation Service (NOTS) and commissioned on December 18, 1918. After fitting out, William N. Page loaded general cargo and locomotives and departed for France. She made several transatlantic trips through the treacherous German U-boat infested waters before finally returning to Norfolk where on May 31, 1919, she was decommissioned by the Navy. After her brief naval career, the William N. Page remained in active merchant service for nearly three decades. Her successive owners and operators included the Mystic Steamship Co., the Koppers Coal Co., and Eastern Gas and Fuel Associates. The latter two companies were majority owners of the Virginian Railway after purchasing a controlling interest from Rogers' heirs in 1936.

Formed in 2002, Virginian Railway (VGN) Enthusiasts a non-profit group of preservationists, authors, photographers, historians, modelers, and rail fans, has grown to over 650 members. Members come from as far from the VGN tracks as Australia and include U.S. troops stationed in the war-torn Middle East. A group of retired railroaders calling themselves "The Virginian Brethren" meet weekly, share tales of the VGN, and answer questions posed by members of the on-line group.

In 2005, the initials "H.H.R." and 'W.N.P." were engraved in the rails of a short stretch of new roadbead laid for a caboose to be displayed at Victoria, a town they caused to be founded on the "Mountains to Sea" railroad. Their Virginian Railway has turned out to be a lasting tribute, both to Henry Huttleston Rogers, and to William Nelson Page, the "Idea Man from Ansted".

References

Bibliography
 Barger, Ralph L. (1983) Corporate History of Coal & Coke Railway Co., Charleston, Clendennin & Sutton R.R., Roaring Creek & Belington R.R. Co., as of Date of Valuation, June 30, 1918. Baltimore, MD: Baltimore & Ohio Railroad Historical Society.
Cartlidge, Oscar (1936) Fifty Years of Coal Mining Charleston, WV: Rose City Press.
Conley, Phil (1960) History of the Coal Industry of West Virginia Charleston, WV: Educational Foundation.
Conley, Phil (1923) Life in a West Virginia Coal Field Charleston, WV: American Constitutional Association.
Corbin, David Alan (1981) Life, Work and Rebellion in the Coal Fields: The Southern West Virginia Miners, 1880–1922 Chicago, Illinois: University of Illinois Press.
Corbin, David Alan, editor (1990) The West Virginia Mine Wars: An Anthology Charleston, WV: Appalachian Editions.
Craigo, Robert W., editor (1977) The New River Company: Mining Coal and Making History, 1906–1976 Mount Hope, WV: New River Company.
Dix, Keith (1977) Work Relations in the Coal Industry: The Hand Loading Era, 1880–1930 Morgantown, WV: West Virginia University Institute for Labor Studies.
Dixon, Thomas W, Jr., (1994) Appalachian Coal Mines & Railroads. Lynchburg, Virginia: TLC Publishing Inc. 
Frazier, Claude Albee (1992) Miners and Medicine: West Virginia Memories Norman, OK: University of Oklahoma Press.
Huddleston, Eugene L, Ph.D. (2002) Appalachian Conquest, Lynchburg, Virginia: TLC Publishing Inc. 
Lambie, Joseph T. (1954) From Mine to Market: The History of Coal Transportation on the Norfolk and Western Railway New York City: New York University Press
Lane, Winthrop David (1921) Civil War in West Virginia: A Story of the Industrial Conflict in the Coal Mines New York, NY: B. W. Huebsch, Inc.
Lewis, Lloyd D. (1992) The Virginian Era. Lynchburg, Virginia: TLC Publishing Inc.
Lewis, Lloyd D. (1994) Norfolk & Western and Virginian Railways in Color by H. Reid. Lynchburg, Virginia: TLC Publishing Inc. 
MacCorkle, William (1928) The Recollections of Fifty Years	New York, New York: G. P. Putnam's Sons Publishing
Middleton, William D. (1974) When The Steam Railroads Electrified (1st ed.). Milwaukee, Wisconsin: Kalmbach Publishing Co. 
Reid, H. (1961) The Virginian Railway (1st ed.). Milwaukee, Wisconsin: Kalmbach Publishing Co.
Reisweber, Kurt (1995) Virginian Rails 1953–1993 (1st ed.) Old Line Graphics. 
Sullivan, Ken, ed. (1991) The Goldenseal Book of the West Virginia Mine Wars: Articles Reprinted from Goldenseal Magazine, 1977–1991. Charleston: Pictorial Histories Pub. Co.
Striplin, E. F. Pat. (1981) The Norfolk & Western: a history Roanoke, Virginia : Norfolk and Western Railway Co. 
Tams, W. P. (1963) The Smokeless Coal Fields of West Virginia Morgantown, WV: West Virginia University Library.
Thoenen, Eugene D. (1964) History of the Oil and Gas Industry in West Virginia Charleston, WV:
Traser, Donald R. (1998) Virginia Railway Depots. Old Dominion Chapter, National Railway Historical Society. 
Various contributors (1968) Who Was Who in America, Volume I (7th ed.). New Providence, New Jersey: Marquis Who's Who
Wiley, Aubrey and Wallace, Conley (1985) The Virginian Railway Handbook. Lynchburg, Virginia: W-W Publications.

Periodicals, business journals, and on-line publications
Beale, Frank D. (1955) The Virginian Railway Company 45th Annual Report Year Ended December 31, 1954. published in-house
Cuthriell, N.L. (1956) Coal On The Move Via The Virginian Railway, reprinted with permission of Norfolk Southern Corporation in 1995 by Norfolk & Western Historical Society, Inc. 
Dept. of the Navy – (2004) Dictionary of American Naval Fighting Ships – article on steamship William N. Page. Washington, D.C.: US Naval Historical Center
Huddleston, Eugene L, Ph.D. (1992) National Railway Bulletin Vol. 57, Number 4, article: Virginian: Henry Huttleston Rogers' Questionable Achievement
Reid, H. (1953) "Trains & Travel Magazine" December, 1953 "Some Fine Engines" Kalmbach Publishing Co.
Skaggs, Geoffery – (1985) Page-Vawter House Project in Ansted Ansted, WV: Fayette County Government

External links
Page-Nelson Society organization of documented descendants of two immigrants from the British Isles (a Nelson and a Page)
Special Collection William Nelson Page Papers, Library of the University of North Carolina at Chapel Hill
US Dept. of the Navy, Naval Historical Center
Millicent Library, Fairhaven MA, Henry Rogers homepage
Mark Twain and Henry Huttleston Rogers in Virginia featuring excerpts from their trips together to the 1907 Jamestown Exposition and the 1909 Dedication of the Virginian Railway
New River CVB Guide to Ansted, WV
Wm. Jordan, information on Ansted WV circa 1889–1909
William Alexander MacCorkle, Governor of West Virginia 1893–1897
Norfolk & Western Historical Society covers Virginian history
Virginia Museum of Transportation displays 2 of only 3 extant VGN steam and electric locomotives, located in Roanoke, VA
Virginian Railway (VGN) Enthusiasts non-profit group of preservationists, authors, photographers, historians, modelers, and railroad enthusiasts
Suffolk-Nansemond Historical Society headquarters in restored Seaboard-Virginian passenger station at Suffolk, VA
Norfolk Southern Corp website
link to site of Railfan.net forum for Virginian Railway which has Roanoke Times Virginian Brethren story and photos

1854 births
1932 deaths
19th-century American railroad executives
American bank presidents
American civil engineers
American construction businesspeople
American financiers
American railway entrepreneurs
20th-century American railroad executives
American people of English descent
American people of Scottish descent
Businesspeople from West Virginia
Businesspeople from Washington, D.C.
American businesspeople in the coal industry
People from Ansted, West Virginia
People from Campbell County, Virginia
Nelson family of Virginia
William Nelson Page
University of Virginia School of Engineering and Applied Science alumni
West Virginia National Guard personnel
American mining businesspeople